Rajeswari Padmanabhan (1939-2008) was a Veena artist from Karnataka, India. Rajeshwari was the ninth generation descendant of the Karaikudi Veena tradition in Carnatic music. She received many awards including Sangeet Natak Akademi Award and Kalaimamani Award given by the Tamil Nadu Eyal Isai Nataka Mantram.

Biography
Rajeshwari Padmanabhan was born in 1939 in Kollur, Udupi district, Karnataka, the daughter of Lakshmi Ammal and the granddaughter of Karaikudi S. Subramanian, the eldest of the Karaikudi Veena brothers.

Rajeswari died on August 15, 2008.

Music career
Rajeshwari was the ninth generation descendant of the Karaikudi Veena tradition. From the age of five, she began to study Veena under his grandfather and younger brother of the Karaikudi brothers, Karaikudi Sambasiva Iyer, in the gurukula system and continued under his guidance until Maestro's death in 1958. She also learned Carnatic vocal music from Mysore Vasudevachar, under the Government of India scholarship. Retired as Principal, she worked and taught at Rukmini Devi College of Fine Arts (Kalakshetra) for many years. Besides performing, she has also composed a few varnams and tillanas and has composed music for the dance drama Kumbheshwar Kuravanji.

Awards and honors
Sangeet Natak Akademi Award
Kalaimamani

References

External links
 Interview with Rajeswari Padmanabhan, in Sruthi magazine

1957 births
2008 deaths
Veena players
Indian percussionists
Carnatic instrumentalists
Indian women classical musicians
Recipients of the Sangeet Natak Akademi Award
Women Carnatic singers
Carnatic singers
Indian women classical singers
Women musicians from Karnataka